Aeolidia filomenae is a species of sea slugs, an aeolid nudibranch, a marine gastropod mollusc in the family Aeolidiidae. Previously confused with Aeolidia papillosa, this species occurs on coasts of the NE Atlantic Ocean from Scotland south to Portugal.

Distribution
This nudibranch species lives on the Atlantic coast of The British Isles and Europe.

Description
Aeolidia filomenae can be identified by its large number of slightly flattened, hooked cerata on its body except for a triangular area that extends from the rhinophores to the mid dorsum. There is frequently a white Y-shaped mark on the head, which can be hard to see in pale individuals.

References

External links
 

Aeolidiidae
Molluscs of the Atlantic Ocean
Gastropods described in 2016